Summer Special 'Be Ma Girl' is the third single album by the South Korean boy group Teen Top. It is also the third music project with  South Korean music producer, Brave Brothers. The album was released both digitally and physically on August 3, 2012. 나랑 사귈래? (Be Ma Girl) was used as the promotional track for the album.

Track listing

Charts

Album chart

Single chart

References

2012 albums
Single albums
Teen Top albums